Scorpia may refer to:

Scorpia (comics),  a fictional super villain in the Marvel Comics universe
Scorpia (journalist), pseudonym for a reviewer in Computer Gaming World
Scorpia (novel), a 2004 Alex Rider novel
Scorpia, a fictional planet in the science fiction television series Battlestar Galactica
Scorpia (She-Ra), a character in the animated television series She-Ra: Princess of Power
Scorpia, a fictional criminal organization in the Phantom comic strip.